State and Eagle Streets Historic District is a national historic district located at Mount Morris in Livingston County, New York. The district is located in one of the oldest residential neighborhoods in the village.  It encompasses 19 contributing primary properties consisting of 16 residences, one parsonage, and two churches; one contributing site, a grave site with granite marker at St. John's Episcopal Church; and four contributing outbuildings, a carriage houses, shed, and two garages.

It was listed on the National Register of Historic Places in 1996.

References

Historic districts on the National Register of Historic Places in New York (state)
Historic districts in Livingston County, New York
National Register of Historic Places in Livingston County, New York